Nicholas Ivan Thune is an American actor, comedian, and musician.

Life and career
Thune was born in Seattle, Washington and grew up in Redmond. Thune moved to Los Angeles to pursue his career in stand-up. His early stand-up shows focused on wordplay while he played the guitar, which he has said was used as more of a prop than to create musical comedy. He has performed on The Tonight Show eight times, and was featured in a Comedy Central Presents special in 2007.

In February 2009, Thune performed at the DTD Reality concert at the University of Southern California.

Thune's debut album, Thick Noon, was released on February 23, 2010 by Comedy Central Records.

Thune's first hour-long stand-up special, Nick Thune: Folk Hero, premiered on Netflix in February 2014. The special was later released on CD and vinyl.

His second hour-long special, Good Guy, premiered on December 22, 2016 on NBC's Seeso platform. The special was filmed in October 2016 in Portland, Oregon. Much of the special was based on the thoughts Thune had prior to having his first child. The special is a change in style for him, as he no longer used his guitar throughout the performance. He first started performing without his guitar after breaking his arm in Tampa, and while continuing work without being able to play the guitar, he realized he enjoyed being on stage without it.

Television 
Thune was cast as a lead in the 2010 NBC pilot for Beach Lane starring opposite Matthew Broderick. However, the pilot was not picked up as a series.  He has since made guest appearances on the comedy programs Traffic Light and Happy Endings in 2011, and Don't Trust the B---- in Apartment 23 in 2012.

Thune worked on a pilot in 2016 with his creative partner Kevin Parker Flynn, Holy Sh*t, a workplace comedy about a small church avoiding a mega-church takeover. The pilot was produced by Mila Kunis' production company.

Thune had a guest starring role on HBO's Love Life as Magnus, one of the relationships opposite Anna Kendrick during Season 1.

Film 
Thune had small roles in the movies Knocked Up and Unaccompanied Minors. In 2017, Thune starred in Dave Made a Maze, playing the titular character. He also starred in the film People You May Know, directed by Sherwin Shilati.

Personal life 
Thune and his wife have one son.

Discography
Thick Noon (2010)
Folk Hero (2014)
Good Guy (2017)

Filmography

References

External links 

 
 Official blog
 
 

1979 births
Living people
American comedy musicians
American male television actors
American stand-up comedians
American people of South African descent
21st-century American comedians